Ariosoma ophidiophthalmus is an eel in the family Congridae (conger/garden eels). It was described by Emma Stanislavovna Karmovskaya in 1991. It is a tropical, marine eel which is known from the Say de Malha Bank in the western Indian Ocean. It is known to dwell at a depth range of 110–115 metres.

The species epithet "ophidiophthalmus" is derived from a Latinized version of the Ancient Greek words "ophis" and "ophthalmus", and refers to the snake-like appearance of the eel's eyes.

References

ophidiophthalmus
Taxa named by Emma Stanislavovna Karmovskaya
Fish described in 1991
Endemic fauna of Mauritius